The Battle of Mbandi Kasi was a military engagement between forces of Portuguese Angola and the Kingdom of Kongo during their first armed conflict which spanned from 1622 to 1623.  The battle, while not widely reported by the Portuguese, was recorded in correspondence between the Kongolese and their Dutch allies.  The battle marked the turn of the short war in the favor of Kongo and led to the ouster of the Portuguese governor of Luanda and the return of Kongolese subjects taken as slaves in earlier campaigns.

As a result of the conflict, the manikongo Pedro II sought an alliance with the Dutch Empire to drive the Portuguese from the region entirely.

Footnotes

See also
First Kongo-Portuguese War
Portuguese Angola
Kingdom of Kongo
History of Angola

Mbandi Kasi
Mbandi Kasi
1623 in Africa
Mbandi Kasi
Portuguese Angola